The 2017–18 UCF Knights men's basketball team represented the University of Central Florida during the 2017–18 NCAA Division I men's basketball season. The Knights are members of the American Athletic Conference. The Knights, in the program's 49th season of basketball, were led by second-year head coach Johnny Dawkins and played their home games at the CFE Arena on the university's main campus in Orlando, Florida. They finished the season 19–13 overall and 9–9 in AAC play to finish in 6th place. In the AAC tournament, they defeated East Carolina in the first round before losing to Houston in the quarterfinals.

Previous season
The Knights finished the 2016–17 season 24–12, 11–7 in AAC play to finish in fourth place. They defeated Memphis in the quarterfinals of the AAC tournament before losing in the semifinals to SMU. They received an invitation to the National Invitation Tournament where they defeated Colorado, Illinois State, and Illinois to advance to the semifinals at Madison Square Garden for the first time in school history. There they lost to the eventual NIT Champion, TCU.

Offseason

Departures

Incoming transfers

2017 recruiting class

2018 recruiting class

Roster

Schedule and results

|-
!colspan=9 style=| Non-conference regular season

|-
!colspan=6 style= |AAC regular season

|-
!colspan=9 style=| American Athletic Conference tournament

References

UCF Knights men's basketball seasons
UCF
UCF Knights men's basketball
UCF Knights men's basketball